Immanuel College may refer to:
Immanuel College, Adelaide, South Australia
Immanuel College, Bushey, an independent co-educational secondary school north of London
Immanuel College, Bradford, a state school in Yorkshire
Immanuel Christian School, New Zealand, in Auckland

See also
Emmanuel College (disambiguation)
Immanuel Lutheran College (disambiguation)